Adrián Portela (born 8 March 1986) is an Argentine handball player for Club Atlético River Plate and the Argentina men's national handball team.

He defended Argentina at the 2015 World Men's Handball Championship in Qatar.

Individual Awards and Achievements
2016 Pan American Men's Club Handball Championship: Best left wing

References

External links
 
 
 
 

1986 births
Living people
Argentine male handball players
Sportspeople from Buenos Aires
Handball players at the 2016 Summer Olympics
Olympic handball players of Argentina
Handball players at the 2015 Pan American Games
Pan American Games medalists in handball
Pan American Games silver medalists for Argentina
Medalists at the 2015 Pan American Games
21st-century Argentine people